Tylopterus is a genus of true weevils in the tribe Hyperini.

References

External links 
 
 Tylopterus at insectoid.info

Curculionidae genera
Hyperinae